Natnael Tesfatsion Ocbit (born 23 May 1999) is an Eritrean cyclist, who currently rides for UCI WorldTeam .

Major results

2019
 2nd Road race, National Road Championships
 4th Gran Premio Sportivi di Poggiana
 5th Overall Tour de l'Espoir
1st  Points classification
1st Stage 1 (TTT)
 6th Ruota d'Oro
2020
 1st  Overall Tour du Rwanda
1st  Young rider classification
1st  African rider classification
1st Stage 4
 2nd Overall La Tropicale Amissa Bongo
1st  Young rider classification
1st Stage 2
2021
 4th Tour du Doubs
 9th Per sempre Alfredo 
2022
 1st  Overall Tour du Rwanda
1st  Young rider classification
1st  African rider classification
 2nd Overall Adriatica Ionica Race
1st  Mountains classification
1st Stage 2
 2nd Road race, National Road Championships
 2nd Giro dell'Appennino
 4th GP Industria & Artigianato
 7th Overall Tour of Romania
 9th Overall Settimana Internazionale di Coppi e Bartali
2023
 5th Figueira Champions Classic

Grand Tour general classification results timeline

References

External links

1999 births
Living people
Eritrean male cyclists
Sportspeople from Asmara